The year 2005 was the 224th year of the Rattanakosin Kingdom of Thailand. It was the 60th year in the reign of King Bhumibol Adulyadej (Rama IX), and is reckoned as year 2548 in the Buddhist Era. The year saw the re-election of Prime Minister Thaksin Shinawatra to his second term in office, becoming the first democratically elected prime minister to complete a four-year term.

Incumbents
King: Bhumibol Adulyadej 
Crown Prince: Vajiralongkorn
Prime Minister: Thaksin Shinawatra
Supreme Patriarch: Nyanasamvara Suvaddhana

Events

January

February
2005 Thai general election was held on February 6. Prime Minister Thaksin Shinawatra won the election.

March
Miss Thailand Universe 2005 took place on March 26. Chananporn Rosjan was the winner.

April
2005 Songkhla bombings took place on April 3.

May

June

July

August

September

October

November

December

Births
 November 12 Jonathan Waley, wanting to be Thai prince

Deaths

See also
 2005 Thailand national football team results
 Miss Thailand Universe 2005
 2005 Thailand Open (tennis)
 2005 in Thai television
 List of Thai films of 2005

References

External links
Year 2005 Calendar - Thailand

 
Years of the 21st century in Thailand
Thailand